Felipe de Jesús Ramos Rizo (born 10 March 1963 in Mexico City) is a Mexican FIFA football referee who officiated three matches at the 2002 FIFA World Cup. He is currently a referee analyst for ESPN Deportes and ESPN Mexico.

Career
Ramos Rizo made his debut as a referee on May 2, 1983. Ramos Rizo officiated the 2000 Summer Olympics gold medal match between Cameroon and Spain. In 2001 FIFA assigned Ramos Rizo to officiate a 2002 World Cup qualifier between Iraq and Iran, which was held in Baghdad, Iraq.

Ramos Rizo was the fourth official in the 2002 FIFA World Cup opening match between France and Senegal which resulted in a win for Senegal. He also officiated a quarterfinal match between England and Brazil where he sent off Ronaldinho in the 57th minute. 

In 2002, Ramos Rizo was involved in several scandals. He was accused of corruption after refereeing a match between Jaguares de Chiapas and Cruz Azul, which Chiapas won 1–0; the match was crucial for Chiapas aspirations, since the team was involved in relegation and a loss would have been critical. Because of this, Ramos Rizo privacy was violated after his phone line was intercepted. In one of the calls, Ramos Rizo attacked Edgardo Codesal, then Head of the Mexican Refereeing Commission, and was vetoed from refereeing in the league and was later barred by the Mexican Football Federation. These events forced Ramos Rizo into retirement, which officially happened in October 2003.

He currently does referee analysis on ESPN Deportes show Futbol Picante and is a writer for several sports publications and websites.

Olympic Games matches officiated

World Cup matches officiated

References

External links
  Profile

1963 births
Living people
Mexican football referees
FIFA World Cup referees
Olympic football referees
Sportspeople from Mexico City
2002 FIFA World Cup referees
CONCACAF Gold Cup referees